Barry Beecroft (born 4 January 1955) is a former Australian rules footballer who played with South Melbourne/Sydney in the Victorian Football League (VFL).

Beecroft played in a variety of positions during his career but he was primarily a ruckman and key defender. Recruited from Ormond, he was initially a regular fixture in the South Melbourne team of the mid 1970s but put together just eight games in 1976. The following season, after two games, Beecroft left for Port Melbourne and played in a winning Grand Final against Sandringham.

He joined WAFL club Claremont in 1979 and in 1981 was a member of their premiership side, although he missed most of the Grand Final after being knocked down by South Fremantle's Basil Campbell. He moved to Sydney in 1982 to play another season with South Melbourne, who had relocated, but finished his career at Claremont.

References

1955 births
Sydney Swans players
Port Melbourne Football Club players
Claremont Football Club players
Ormond Amateur Football Club players
Living people
Australian rules footballers from Victoria (Australia)